Utah State Route 135 may refer to:

 Utah State Route 135, a short divided state highway in northern Utah County
 Utah State Route 135 (1933-1969), Millard County
 Utah State Route 135 (1969-1992), Sevier County

See also
 List of highways numbered 135